Arctia sieversi is a moth in the family Erebidae. It was described by Grigory Grum-Grshimailo in 1891. It is found in Qinghai, China.

This species, along with the others of the genus Sinoarctia, was moved to Arctia as a result of phylogenetic research published by Rönkä et al. in 2016.

References

Moths described in 1891
Arctiina